Zinc finger protein 296 is a protein that in humans is encoded by the ZNF296 gene.

References

Further reading 

Human proteins